Trondheim, Norway is the seat of the Roman Catholic Territorial Prelature of Trondheim, which before March 1979 was the Apostolic Vicariate of Central Norway. The prelature leadership is currently under bishop Erik Varden. The prelature includes parishes in Trondheim, Kristiansund, Levanger, Molde, and Ålesund.

History

The Reformation in Norway ended organized Roman Catholic practice in 1537. Between 1688 and 1834, northern Norway was included as part of the Roman Catholic Apostolic Vicariate of the Nordic Missions, before it passed to the Apostolic Vicariate of Sweden in 1834. In 1855, Norway north of the Arctic Circle became part of the new Apostolic Prefecture of the North Pole, while the rest of Norway (including Trondheim) remained in the Apostolic Vicariate of Sweden. On August 17, 1869, northern Norway rejoined with the rest of Norway in the new Apostolic Prefecture of Norway, which upgraded to Apostolic Vicariate of Norway in 1892. 

When Norwegian Reformation drove the Catholic archbishop out of the archdiocese of Nidaros (Trondheim) in 1537, there were no indications of organized Catholic practice there until 1844, when five residents asked the priest in Oslo to visit them, apparently to help one of their children prepare for First Communion. The first Catholic parish was re-established in Trondheim in 1872, with French-born Claude Dumahut as the pastor. In 1875, the church bought property at Stiklestad in the hopes of building a chapel there to commemorate the martyrdom of St. Olav at the Battle of Stiklestad in 1030. Though the parish was founded, and continues to be led by clergy from the Congregation of the Sacred Hearts of Jesus and Mary, several monastic ordersincluding the Salesians, Sisters of St. Joseph and Order of St. Elisabethtried with mixed success to establish themselves in the area. A seminary was established in 1880, graduating a small group of priests in 1885, who made the first pilgrimage to Stiklestad in hundreds of years.

Additional parishes were founded in Trondheim (Sacred Heart in 1881, and St. Olav in 1902; later merged as St. Olav), Molde (1923), and in 1930 the chapel at Stiklestad was complete in time for the 900th anniversary of the battle there.

On 10 April 1931, the Roman Catholic Apostolic Vicariate of Norway was divided into three jurisdictions, originally two mission sui iuris (missions in areas with very few Catholics, often desolate or remote) and a marginally more populated apostolic vicariate. Over the remainder of the 20th century, as the Catholic population grew in these areas, and as transportation infrastructure overcame some of the remoteness, these jurisdictions have advanced through apostolic prefecture, apostolic vicariate, two have grown to territorial prelature, and one jurisdiction has grown to become a full diocese. 

The jurisdiction for southern Norway started as the Apostolic Vicariate of Oslo (1931–1953), growing quickly enough to become the Roman Catholic Diocese of Oslo in 1953. The jurisdiction for Norway north of the polar circle started as the Missionary District of Northern Norway (1931–1944), growing to the Apostolic Prefecture of Northern Norway (1944–1955), the Apostolic Vicariate of Northern Norway (1955–1979), and the Roman Catholic Territorial Prelature of Tromsø on 28 March 1979.

The jurisdiction for central Norway started as the Missionary District of Central Norway (1931–1935), growing to the Apostolic Prefecture of Central Norway (1935–1953), the Apostolic Vicariate of Central Norway (1953–1979), then the Roman Catholic Territorial Prelature of Trondheim.

During the occupation of Norway by Nazi Germany, the mostly German-born clergy in central Norway took part in the Norwegian resistance movement; one of them, Antonius Deutsch, was subsequently decorated by king Haakon VII.

In 1989, Pope John Paul II visited Trondheim and held an ecumenical service in the Church of Norway's Nidaros Cathedral, as well as a Catholic mass at a nearby sports facility. In 1993, the Church of Norway authorized a full Catholic mass to be held in the Nidaros Cathedral, for the first time since the 1537 Reformation.

Leadership

Under the apostolic vicariate in Sweden (until 1868) 
1843–1868 - Laurentius J. Studach (resident in Sweden)

The apostolic prefecture in Norway (1869–1892)

1869–1887 - Bernard Bernard
1887–1892 - Johannes Olav Fallize

The apostolic vicariate in Norway (1892–1931)

 1892–1922 - Johannes Olaf Fallize
1922–1928 - Johannes Olav Smit
1928–1930 - Olav Offerdahl
1930–1931 - Henrik Irgens (apostolic administrator)

The missionary district of Central Norway (1931–1935)
 1931–1932 - Henrik Irgens (apostolic administrator)
 1932–1935 - Cyprian Witte SS.CC.

The apostolic prefecture Central Norway
 1935–1945 - Cyprian Witte SS.CC.
 1945–1953 - Antonius Deutsch SS.CC.

The apostolic vicariate Central Norway
 1953–1974 - Johannes Rüth SS.CC.
 1974–1979 - Gerhard Schwenzer SS.CC.

Trondheim prelature
 1979–1983 - Gerhard Schwenzer SS.CC.
 1983–1988 - Gerhard Schwenzer, administrator sede vacante
 1988–1997 - Georg Müller SS.CC., administrator sede vacante
 1997–2009 - Georg Müller SS.CC.
 2009–2019 - Bernt Ivar Eidsvig C.R.S.A., administrator sede vacante
 2019–present - Erik Varden, O.C.S.O.

See also 
 Roman Catholic Church in Norway
 Roman Catholic Diocese of Oslo
 Roman Catholic Territorial Prelature of Tromsø

References

Sources
 History of Trondheim prelature on the Catholic church's website in Norway

Catholic Church in Norway
Territorial prelatures
Roman Catholic dioceses in Nordic Europe
Christian organizations established in 1935
Territorial Prelature of Trondheim
Territorial Prelature of Trondheim
1935 establishments in Norway